Epinastine (brand names Alesion, Elestat, Purivist, Relestat) is a second-generation antihistamine and mast cell stabilizer that is used in eye drops to treat allergic conjunctivitis. It is produced by Allergan and marketed by Inspire in the United States. It is highly selective for the H1 receptor and does not cross the blood-brain-barrier.

It was patented in 1980 and came into medical use in 1994.

References

External links 
  Official U.S. website of Elestat

Azepanes
H1 receptor antagonists
Guanidines
AbbVie brands
Mast cell stabilizers
Peripherally selective drugs